Langelier station is a Montreal Metro station in the borough of Mercier–Hochelaga-Maisonneuve in Montreal, Quebec, Canada. It is operated by the Société de transport de Montréal (STM) and serves the Green Line. It is in the district of Mercier-Ouest. The station opened on June 6, 1976, as part of the extension of the Green Line to Honoré-Beaugrand station.

Overview 

Designed by Victor Prus & André G. Dionne, it is a normal side platform station built in tunnel. The central mezzanine, built within the tunnel vault, gives access to three entrances on three corners at the intersection of Sherbrooke Street East and Langelier Boulevard.
 6595, rue Sherbrooke est
 6610, rue Sherbrooke est
 3355, boul. Langelier

On the platforms, sculptural grilles by Charles Daudelin conceal ventilation intakes.

Origin of the name
The station is located on rue Sherbrooke Est at boulevard Langelier, named for Sir François Langelier (1838–1915), who served in a number of high offices in Quebec, including mayor of Quebec City (1882–1890) and Lieutenant-Governor (1911–1915).

Connecting bus routes

Nearby points of interest
 Carrefour Langelier - (With bus 33 north)
 Centre commercial Domaine
 Bibliothèque Langelier
 Saint-François d'Assise Cemetery
 Canadian Forces Base Montréal garrison ASU Longue-Pointe

References

External links

 Langelier Station - official site
 Montreal by Metro, metrodemontreal.com - photos, information, and trivia
 Metro Map
 STM 2011 System map

Green Line (Montreal Metro)
Brutalist architecture in Canada
Mercier–Hochelaga-Maisonneuve
Railway stations in Canada opened in 1976